Equine encephalitis is a family of horse diseases that also affect humans.  Encephalitis is an inflammation of the brain. Several forms of viral encephalitis can infect equines, and these include:

 Eastern equine encephalitis virus
 Japanese encephalitis virus
 Venezuelan equine encephalitis virus
 Western equine encephalitis virus
 West Nile virus

Horse diseases